The 1907–08 Holy Cross Crusaders men's basketball team represented The College of the Holy Cross during the 1907–08 college men's basketball men's basketball season. The head coach was Fred Powers, coaching the crusaders in his sixth season.

Schedule

|-

References

Holy Cross Crusaders men's basketball seasons
Holy Cross